Chung Mong-won (born 4 August 1955) is a South Korean ice hockey administrator and businessman. He has served as chief executive officer of both Halla Group and Mando Corporation, founded the Anyang Halla hockey team in 1994, and co-founded Asia League Ice Hockey in 2003. He became involved in international ice hockey as manager of the South Korea men's national ice hockey team in 2003, then became chairman of the Korea Ice Hockey Association in 2013, and implemented a development plan for the men's national team and the South Korea women's national ice hockey team in advance of ice hockey at the 2018 Winter Olympics hosted in South Korea. Under his leadership, the men's national team earned promotion to the top tier at the 2018 IIHF World Championship, and the women's national team played in the 2018 Winter Olympics on a Unified Korea team with North Korea. The International Ice Hockey Federation (IIHF) has named Chung to its 2020 IIHF Hall of Fame group of inductees.

Early life and education
Chung was born on 4 August 1955, in Seoul, South Korea. He is the second son of Chung In-young, who founded Halla Group.

Chung graduated from Seoul High School in 1974, earned a Bachelor of Business Administration degree from Korea University in 1979, and a Master of Business Administration degree from the University of Southern California in 1982.

Business career
Chung joined the Halla Group in 1978, employed in shipping. He later joined Hyundai Corporation as a manager, then became executive director of Mando Corporation Machinery in 1983. He became president and chief executive officer of Halla Climate Control in 1986, president of Mando Corporation Machinery in 1989, then president and chief executive officer of Halla in 1991. He served as vice-chairman of Halla Group starting in 1992, then became its chairman in 1997. Due to the 1997 Asian financial crisis, he disbanded the group in 1998. Halla Group was reformed in 2001, with Chung as its chairman and chief executive officer. In 2017, he purchased Mando and transformed it into a holding company, then became its chairman and chief executive officer.

Professional hockey team owner
Chung became involved in ice hockey in 1994, after his employees asked to form a team. He financed the foundation of a professional hockey team in 1994 known as Mando Winia, which later became Halla Winia and then Anyang Halla. He was a co-founder of the Asia League Ice Hockey in 2003, which included teams from China, Japan, and the Russian Far East, in addition to Korea. As of 2020, Anyang Halla have won five Asia League Ice Hockey championships, won the most regular-season games, and regularly sends players to represent Korea in international competitions.

Chung was a franchise owner of Kiekko-Vantaa from 2012 to 2015, as a subsidiary of Halla Group.

Korean international ice hockey
Chung served as manager of the South Korea men's national ice hockey team for seven Ice Hockey World Championships between 2003 and 2016. He became vice-president of the Korea Ice Hockey Association in 2010, then was elected its president in 2013. The national team earned several promotions during his tenure, which included winning Division II three times in 2003, 2007, and 2009, then winning Division 1 in 2012 and again in 2015. In 2015, Chung signed an agreement with DHL for logistics support, which meant that players and team staff no longer had to transport equipment themselves. He served as manager of the South Korea under-18 men's national ice hockey team manager during competitions in 2017 and 2018.

After Pyeongchang County was named host of the 2018 Winter Olympics, Chung set out to improve South Korea's standing in the world ice rankings to ensure its participation in ice hockey at the 2018 Winter Olympics. He hired Sarah Murray to coach the South Korea women's national ice hockey team, and brought in Jim Paek and Richard Park who both had playing experience in the National Hockey League to coach the men's national team. The men's team placed second in 2017 IIHF World Championship Division I to earn promotion to the top tier at the 2018 IIHF World Championship. The women's team played together on a Unified Korea team including athletes from North Korea and South Korea, a first for the two Koreas at the Olympic Games. 

Chung has stated a desire for the Gangneung Hockey Centre to become the focus of ice hockey in Korea, and to leave an Olympic Games legacy. He said, "My dream is to turn Gangneung into a hockey town. I hope to see the day when people think of Gangneung, they'll think of hockey". In 2019, the Korea Ice Hockey Association voted to run its national development programs in Gangneung.

Awards and honours
On 18 April 2019, Chung was named as the honorary consul of the Republic of Slovenia to South Korea, based at the Sigma Tower in Jamsil, Seoul. He was named by the International Ice Hockey Federation (IIHF) to the builder's category in the 2020 class of IIHF Hall of Fame inductees. The induction was scheduled the 2020 IIHF World Championship in Zürich, but was delayed until the 2022 IIHF World Championship due to the COVID-19 pandemic.

Personal life
Chung met his wife, Hong In-hwa on a blind date at a church, and the couple have two daughters. He is an elder of the Korean Methodist Church.

Family

References

Further reading
 

1955 births
Living people
20th-century South Korean businesspeople
21st-century South Korean businesspeople
Asia League Ice Hockey
Chief executives in the automobile industry
Chief executives in the sports industry
Honorary consuls
Hyundai Group
IIHF Hall of Fame inductees
Korea University alumni
Seoul High School alumni
South Korean chief executives
South Korean ice hockey people
South Korean Methodists
South Korean sports executives and administrators
Sportspeople from Seoul
University of Southern California alumni